Max Life Insurance Company Limited (formerly known as Max New York Life Insurance Company Limited) is an Indian life insurance company headquartered at New Delhi, and the largest non-bank private-sector life insurer in India. It is a 80:20 joint venture between Max Financial Services and Axis Bank. The company is a subsidiary of the publicly-listed Max Financial Services. It was founded in 2000 after the liberalization of the insurance sector in India and its operations began in 2001.

Max Life Insurance is a part of Max Group.

History 
Max Life Insurance started as a joint venture between Max Financial Services and Mitsui Sumitomo Insurance Group. The former owned 68% of the company while the latter owned 26%. After forming the joint venture partnership with Mitsui Sumitomo, Max Life changed its name from Max New York Life in 2012. In February 2016, Axis Bank held a 6% share in Max Life.

Products and services  
Max Life sells policies on both online and offline channels. Its distribution channels include banks, individual agents, brokers, and corporate agents, among others. It provides linked, participating and non-participating products. Apart from life coverage, it also covers health, pension, and annuity. It offers child protection, retirement, savings, and growth plans to individuals and to groups.

Advertising campaigns 
Max Life Insurance has carried out several advertising campaigns. A few prominent are:
 Second Chance – Launched in January 2015. The campaign had two videos where people spoke about how life gave them a second chance. The campaign was created to spread awareness about the importance of protection through life insurance. 
 Sachchi Advice – Launched in August 2015 through the TVC medium, the campaign aimed to highlight the company's focus on providing transparent advice to all of its customers.

References

External links 

   

Financial services companies established in 2000
Life insurance companies of India
Max Group
Indian companies established in 2000
Companies based in Delhi
2000 establishments in Delhi